Miller Place is a hamlet and census-designated place (CDP) in the Town of Brookhaven, Suffolk County, New York, United States, on the North Shore of Long Island. Miller Place has been inhabited since the 17th century and is named for the Miller family that included many of its initial settlers. For most of its history, the community functioned as an agriculture-based society. Despite preserving much of its historic identity, changes in the 20th century have transitioned the hamlet into a desirable and densely populated suburban area. The population was 11,723 at the 2020 census.

The hamlet borders the areas of Sound Beach, Mount Sinai, Rocky Point, Middle Island and Coram.   Miller Place and Mount Sinai have historically been linked, with residents sharing such institutions as the Mount Sinai Congregational Church, located on the hamlet's border. The harborfront section of Port Jefferson, five miles to the west, serves as the primary commercial downtown for residents of both Miller Place and Mount Sinai.

History

Agricultural hamlet
The land that Miller Place occupies was purchased from the native Setalcott tribe in 1664 by settlers of Setauket.  The parcel also included what would become Mount Sinai, an adjacent community of similar character with which Miller Place would share a variety of functions throughout its history.

The first known dwelling in the area was constructed in the 1660s by Captain John Scott, an important figure in Long Island's early history.  This house was named Braebourne and features on a map of the New England region credited to Scott, who served as a royal advisor and cartographer among other occupations.  This abode, on the eastern side of Mount Sinai Harbor, was one of three houses John Scott commissioned, and the actual occupier is unknown.

While the original settler of Miller Place is unknown, the settling of the region is largely accredited to the original Miller family. In 1679, an East Hampton settler named Andrew Miller purchased a  plot.  Miller was a cooper by profession, and records indicate that he had emigrated from either Maidstone, England or Craigmillar, Scotland.

By the early 1700s, the community had become known as Miller's Place.  The Miller family expanded well into the 18th century and continually developed houses in the northern part of the hamlet.  The Millers were in time joined by members of such families as the Helmes, Robinsons, Burnetts, Hawkins, Woodhulls, and Thomases.  Many roads in the present hamlet have been named after historical families.

The oldest extant house is the home of William Miller, Andrew Miller's grandson, composed in three sections between 1720 and 1816 at a prominent location on North Country Road.  The hamlet's many extant historical structures are centered on this thoroughfare, forming the core of the Miller Place Historic District.  Listed on the National Register of Historic Places in 1976, it became the first historic district in the Town of Brookhaven. Separately listed is the Samuel Hopkins House.

The American Revolutionary War divided the town, with the majority siding with the Patriot cause but families being split across both lines. A number of midnight raids occurred, one of which resulted in the shooting of a teenaged Miller who had peered out of his window to check on the commotion.   The march of Benjamin Tallmadge, who led eighty men to the victorious overthrow of a British stronghold at Manor St. George, traversed along the town's western border.

In 1789, the neighboring communities of Miller Place and Mount Sinai organized a Congregational church on the town border. While the Mount Sinai Congregational Church building (an extant structure from 1807) is technically in Mount Sinai, the house for its minister was built in Miller Place and continues to be used for that purpose.

The first two public schools in the hamlet were established in 1813 and 1837. In 1834 the Miller Place Academy, a private school, was established under the leadership of a Yale graduate.  Though the academy itself closed in 1868, it served as a public school from 1897 until the 1937 opening of what is now the North Country Road Middle School.  The Miller Place Academy structure remains as one of the community's symbols and currently houses a free library.

Resort town

In 1895 the hamlet became home to a station of the Long Island Rail Road, which was located near the present-day intersection of Sylvan and Echo avenues. It transported people to stops westward to Port Jefferson and New York City or eastward to Wading River. After the station was destroyed in a 1903 fire, a new one was built. However, this building was destroyed in 1934 by another fire, and the eastern railroad lines were soon abandoned. In 2013 an agreement was signed between local politicians and the Long Island Power Authority (LIPA), which currently manages the strip on which the railroad operated, to convert this land into a public bicycle trail.

In the latter 19th century, Miller Place became a popular summer resort location.  This led to a building boom of beach-side bungalows, rustic log cabins, and commercial activities to accommodate the new seasonal residents. A barn-like building known as the Harbor House operated as a dormitory-style vacation house for young girls until it was destroyed in a 1962 fire. Camp Barstow, a Girl Scout camp near the beach, was active until 1980 and has since become public parkland.

Modern development

In the decades following World War II, the population of Miller Place greatly expanded, and the majority of beach cottages were repurposed as family homes. 

A 2012 plan by the Town of Brookhaven aims to comprehensively manage Route 25a between Mount Sinai and Wading River under planning strategies counter to those of car-oriented mid-century suburbia. For Miller Place, it intends to transition the section at Echo and Sylvan Avenues into a traditional downtown center with new mixed-use development and an expanded Sylvan Avenue Park that would complement the current town post office and senior center. The plan additionally calls for the preservation of the DeLea Sod Farm, the largest agricultural parcel remaining on the Miller Place stretch of Route 25a.

Geography

Miller Place is located on Long Island's North Shore and contains a 2-mile section of beach. It also hugs the east side of Mount Sinai Harbor, which it shares with neighboring Mount Sinai and Port Jefferson.

The area is hilly in some patches, mostly near the beach, but generally has desirable grass and trees. Though the soil is suitable for agriculture, desire for housing has led most farms to be developed into suburban housing communities or commercial locations.

Demographics

Demographics of the CDP
As of the census of 2020, there were 11,723 people, 3,847 households, and 3.11 persons per household residing in the CDP. The 2010 population density was 1,883.4 per square mile (566.6/km2). The racial makeup of the CDP was 88.7% White alone, not Hispanic or Latino, 0.3% African American, 0.0% Native American, 1.0% Asian, 0.00% Pacific Islander, and 2.4% from two or more races.  9.1% of the population were Hispanic or Latino of any race. The population had previously increased to 12,339 people in the 2010 census.

In the CDP, the age distribution of the population was a wide spread, with 25.7% under the age of 18, 10.9% from 18 to 24, 17.6% from 25 to 44, 29.1% from 45 to 64, and 16.7% who were 65 years of age or older. Overall the population was 48.6% women.

The median income (in 2019 US dollars) for a household in the CDP was $130,341. The per capita income for the CDP was $49,772.  2.5% of the population were below the poverty threshold.

Economy 

 
The center of commerce within the hamlet has largely transitioned from the historic North Country Road to the modern Route 25A.

Along North Country Road is McNulty's, a family-owned ice cream parlor and a fixture of the hamlet, and a handful of inns and restaurants located in historic structures. Route 25A is of a more suburban character, with most businesses being corporate chains and located in strip malls. Also along Route 25A are multiple pizza parlors, a bagel store, a deli, and a local coffee shop and bar.

The hamlet is home to many residents who commute daily to New York City. Commuters either use the Long Island Rail Road, with the nearest stations in Port Jefferson and Ronkonkoma, or drive along the extensive highway system that had been developed by Robert Moses. A number of residents also work at nearby Stony Brook University and Brookhaven National Laboratory.

Parks and recreation
Cordwood Landing County Park has become a popular local destination. The park consists of hilly, wooded trails that lead directly down to extended Cedar Beach.

Education

The four schools of the Miller Place Union Free School District are scattered throughout the hamlet and serve both Miller Place and much of the hamlet of Sound Beach. These include the Andrew Muller Primary School (K-2), Laddie A. Decker Sound Beach School (3–5), North Country Road Middle School (6–8), and the Miller Place High School (9–12). The high school has been ranked the 78th in the nation for students taking AP classes. The school's mascot is a panther, while the school colors are red, white and blue.

Health care 
There are several  walk-in clinics and urgent care centers in Miller Place including, Caremed Primary and Urgent Care, CityMD, and Northwell Health-GoHealth Urgent Care.

Notable people 
 Mike DelGuidice, guitarist and vocalist for the Billy Joel Band
 Ralph Macchio, actor of Italian ancestry
 Caleb Smith Woodhull, mayor of New York City from 1849 to 1851

See also

 Miller Place High School
 Miller Place station

References

External links
 Miller Place Fire Department
 Miller Place Pirate House (Long Island Oddities)
 Miller Place School District

Brookhaven, New York
Long Island Sound
Hamlets in New York (state)
Census-designated places in New York (state)
Census-designated places in Suffolk County, New York
Hamlets in Suffolk County, New York
Populated coastal places in New York (state)